The Karaboro languages are spoken in Burkina Faso by approximately 65,000 people (SIL 1995/1991). They belong to the Senufo subfamily, but are separated from other Senufo languages by a small band of unrelated languages. Within Senufo they are thought to be most closely related to the Senari languages.

Footnotes

Bibliography
 Hook, A., R. Mills and E. Mills (1975). L'Enquête Dialectale Karabora, Société Internationale de Linguistique and University of Ouagadougou.
 Mills, Elizabeth (1984) Senoufo phonology, discourse to syllabe (a prosodic approach) SIL publications in linguistics (ISSN 1040-0850), 72.

 
Languages of Burkina Faso
Senufo languages